Gabriel Ruiz may refer to:

Gabriel Ruiz (songwriter) (1908–1999), Mexican songwriter
Gabriel Ruiz (footballer) (born 1980), Argentine footballer